BASF is a European multinational chemical company.

BASF may also refer to:
 Bar Association of San Francisco
 Bay Area Science Festival